FAS is a Salvadoran sports club based in Santa Ana that is best known for its professional football team playing in the country's top-tier division, the Primera División. Founded in 1947, after the union of all the clubs in Santa Ana (including Unión, Colegio Salesiano San José, Cosmos, RAL, Colón, Santa Lucía and Los 44). Samuel Zaldaña Galdámez the first club president invitied Salvadoran Armando Chacón to become the football team's first official head coach..

As of the end of the 2022 Clausura, FAS have had 50 managers of 12 nationalities, eight of which assumed caretaking roles. A total of 30 managers completed at least one season with the club, and 28 won at least one title. Salvadoran's José Eugenio "Chepito" Castro is FAS's most successful manager with 3 titles, including 2 regional championships and One International title. Peruvian Agustin Castillo holds the record with league titles, with 5 titles. 

The current manager is Ecuadorian Octavio Zambrano, who succeeded Jorge Rodríguez at the end of the 2022 Clausura season.

List of Head Coaches of FAS from when the club was formed: FAS have had 49 coaches 

Information correct as of the match played on 27 June 2022.

References

C.D. FAS
C.D. FAS